Hayim David HaLevi (24 January 1924 – 10 March 1998),
was Sephardi Chief Rabbi of Tel Aviv-Yafo.

Biography
Hayim David HaLevi was born in Jerusalem. He studied under Rabbi Ben-Zion Meir Hai Uziel at the Porat Yosef Yeshiva. When R. Uziel was appointed Sephardi Chief Rabbi of Israel, he hired HaLevi as his personal secretary. HaLevi served in the Israel Defense Forces (IDF) during 1948 Arab-Israeli War.

Rabbinic career
He was appointed chief rabbi of Rishon Le-Zion in 1951. In 1964, he became a member of Israel's Chief Rabbinate Council. He became chief rabbi of Tel Aviv-Yafo in 1973, taking over from R. Ovadia Yosef. HaLevi was known for his clear-headed approach to halakha, particularly  relating to the Jewish state.  Though unquestionably tied to Sephardi minhag, liturgy and halakha,  HaLevi also included Ashkenazi halakhic positions and customs in his books and responsa.
HaLevi is said to be the first rabbi to issue a Halachic prohibition on smoking.

Awards and recognition
In 1997, HaLevi was awarded the Israel Prize, for Rabbinical studies.

Published works
Mekor Hayim haShalem, a five-volume account of Jewish law and practice with reasons, in easy language.
Kitzur Shulchan Arukh Mekor Hayim, a one-volume digest of the above code giving practical conclusions only.
Aseh L'kha Rav, a collection of responsa.
Dvar HaMishpat, a commentary on Maimonides's Hilchot Sanhedrin.
Torat Hayim, 3 volumes of essays about the weekly parasha and the Jewish holydays.
Mayim Hayim, responsa
The life of Rabbi Ben Zion Meir Chai Uziel 
Dat Umidina, (Religion and state) an approach of how to balance religion and state (Published 1968)

See also
List of Israel Prize recipients

References

Further reading
 Encyclopaedia Judaica, "Halevi, Hayim David"
 Aseh L'khah Rav 1:23 on the lack of a clear commandment concerning conversion, "Halevi, Hayim David, translated in 2010 by Jeffrey A. Spitzer (Hebrew and English)
 Urim Publications:  Rabbi Haim David Halevy - Gentle Scholar and Courageous Thinker 

1924 births
1998 deaths
Sephardi rabbis
Israel Prize in Rabbinical literature recipients
Israel Prize Rabbi recipients
Chief rabbis of Tel Aviv
Levites
Exponents of Jewish law
Authors of books on Jewish law